Sir Ernest Beachcroft Beckwith Towse,  (23 April 1864 – 21 June 1948) was an English British Army officer and campaigner for the blind. He was a recipient of the Victoria Cross, the highest and most prestigious award for gallantry in the face of the enemy that can be awarded to British and Commonwealth forces.

Military career
Towse, the son of a solicitor, was born in London, and was educated at Stubbington House School, Gosport, and Wellington College, Berkshire. In 1883 he joined the 3rd battalion Seaforth Highlanders and was promoted lieutenant in December 1885. In 1886 he transferred to the Gordon Highlanders. He distinguished himself with the Chitral Expedition in 1895, was promoted to captain on 20 May 1896, and served in the Tirah Campaign on the North-West Frontier of India in 1898.

After the outbreak of the Second Boer War in October 1899, his battalion was sent to South Africa. They were part of large force sent to relieve the Siege of Kimberley, and took part in the Battle of Magersfontein on 10–11 December 1899, in which the defending Boer force defeated the advancing British, causing  heavy casualties. Towse was mentioned in the despatch from Lord Methuen describing the battle.

Details on the Victoria Cross
Towse was 35 years old, and a captain in the 1st Battalion, The Gordon Highlanders during the Second Boer War when the following deeds led to the award of the Victoria Cross:

The shot that blinded Towse was fired by the Russian volunteer Yevgeny Maximov who was struggling with Towse during the action on Mount Thaba. Queen Victoria, it is said, shed tears when pinning the decoration. Possibly at her instance, The War Office awarded Towse with a special wounds pension of £300 a year.

He retired from the army in February 1902, but was appointed by King Edward VII one of His Majesty′s Honourable Corps of Gentlemen at Arms on 1 January 1903.

Campaigner for the blind

Towse′s VC action left him blind and he spent much of the rest of his life working with the blind. He served in the First World War as a staff officer working with the wounded in base hospitals in France and Belgium, as well as promoting the welfare of blinded former servicemen. Towse was chairman of the British and Foreign Blind Association, founded the British Wireless for the Blind Fund in 1928 and was a trustee of The Association for Promoting the General Welfare of the Blind (GWB, now known as CLARITY - Employment for Blind People). He provided GWB a grant of £500, which enabled them to start making soap.  

In 1940 he made his house available as a rehabilitation centre for civilians blinded through air raids. His sister, Beatrice Julia Beckwith Towse, was a committee member of the Disabled Officers Garden Homes (formerly Ex-Officers Direct Supply Association) organisation; she lived with him after his injury. 

Among other appointments, Towse was a national vice-president of the British Legion from 1927, and Vice Patron of St Dunstans (now Blind Veterans UK) from 1946, holding both posts until his death in 1948.

Pipe Major George S. McLennan (1884–1929) of the Gordon Highlanders composed the 2/4 march "Captain E.B.B. Towse, V.C." in his honour.

The VC medal
His Victoria Cross is displayed at the Gordon Highlanders Museum, Aberdeen, Scotland.

Medals and honours

Source:

Other honours
Towse also received a number of other honours, including sergeant-at-arms in ordinary to the queen (appointed 1900); member of the Honourable Corps of Gentlemen-at-Arms (1903–39); and was also a member of the Fishmongers' Company and the court of the Clothworkers' Company.

References

Monuments to Courage (David Harvey, 1999)
The Register of the Victoria Cross (This England, 1997)
Scotland's Forgotten Valour (Graham Ross, 1995)
Victoria Crosses of the Anglo-Boer War (Ian Uys, 2000)

External links
 Location of grave and VC medal (Oxfordshire)
 
 Angloboerwar.com Biography
 HappyDispatches Ch.14
 Military History Journal

1864 births
1948 deaths
Burials in Oxfordshire
Military personnel from London
English blind people
British military personnel of the Tirah campaign
British Army personnel of the Second Boer War
British Army personnel of World War I
British military personnel of the Chitral Expedition
British charity and campaign group workers
British Army recipients of the Victoria Cross
British recipients of the Victoria Cross
Founders of charities
Seaforth Highlanders officers
Gordon Highlanders officers
Commanders of the Order of the British Empire
Knights Commander of the Royal Victorian Order
People educated at Wellington College, Berkshire
People from Westminster
Knights of Grace of the Order of St John
Honourable Corps of Gentlemen at Arms
People educated at Stubbington House School
Second Boer War recipients of the Victoria Cross